Macarencu is a Romanian surname. Notable people with the surname include:

 Aurel Macarencu (born 1963), Romanian sprint canoer
 Cuprian Macarencu, Romanian sprint canoer

Romanian-language surnames